Ramesh Nair (born 1965) is an Indian-born fashion designer based in Paris, France. He has designed womenswear for Hermès under Martin Margiela and Jean-Paul Gaultier.

From 2010 to 2020 he was creative director for Moynat Paris. Since 2020, he has been artistic director for Joseph Duclos.

Early life 
Nair was born in 1965 in Kerala, India, and received an eclectic schooling traveling across the country with his military family. After graduating with a degree in Botany, he attended the newly established National Institute of Fashion Technology (NIFT), New Delhi / Fashion Institute of Technology (FIT New York.

Fashion 
After graduating from NIFT in fashion design, and a scholarship from the Inlaks Foundation to intern with a design house in Italy, Nair worked on projects with Yohji Yamamoto. At this time, he also created his own design studio.

In 2000, Nair moved to Paris for a Master’s programme at the Institut Français de la Mode (IFM) and an internship at Christian Lacroix. 

This was followed by a ten-year stint at Hermes Paris as assistant to Martin Margiela for Womenswear and then with Jean-Paul Gaultier.

During this time Nair also created bags, accessories and jewellery for both the permanent collection as well as the runway.

Leather goods 
At the end of 2010, Nair was hired by LVMH to be artistic director for Moynat, a trunk maker and leather goods brand that had been dormant for 30 years. Alongside the creative aspects of the work, he also took on numerous other roles in the company: research and reconstitution of archives, strategic positioning and story telling, and brand marketing.

In 2020 Nair, as artistic director, revived a luxury house Joseph Duclos, building on the heritage of a royal manufacture of fine leathers dating from 1754.

References 

1965 births
Living people
People from Kerala
Fashion designers